Jamin Ben Raskin (born December 13, 1962) is an American attorney, law professor, and politician serving as the U.S. representative for Maryland's 8th congressional district since 2017. A member of the Democratic Party, he served in the Maryland State Senate from 2007 to 2016. The district previously included portions of Montgomery County, a suburban county northwest of Washington, D.C., and extended through rural Frederick County to the Pennsylvania border. Following redistricting in 2022, Raskin's district now encompasses only a portion of Montgomery County.

Raskin chairs the Subcommittee on Civil Rights and Civil Liberties and co-chairs the Congressional Freethought Caucus. He was also the lead impeachment manager for the second impeachment of President Donald Trump in response to the attack on the U.S. Capitol. Before his election to Congress, he was a constitutional law professor at American University Washington College of Law, where he co-founded and directed the LL.M. program on law and government and co-founded the Marshall-Brennan Constitutional Literacy Project.

Early life and career
Jamin Ben Raskin was born to a Jewish family in Washington, D.C., on December 13, 1962, to Barbara (née Bellman) Raskin and Marcus Raskin. His mother was a journalist and novelist, and his father was a former staff aide to President John F. Kennedy on the National Security Council, co-founder of the Institute for Policy Studies, and a progressive activist. Raskin's ancestors immigrated to the U.S. from Russia. He graduated from Georgetown Day School in 1979 at age 16, and magna cum laude and Phi Beta Kappa from Harvard College in 1983 with a Bachelor of Arts in government with concentration in political theory. In 1987, he received a J.D. degree magna cum laude from Harvard Law School, where he was an editor of the Harvard Law Review.

For more than 25 years, Raskin was a constitutional law professor at American University Washington College of Law, where he taught future fellow impeachment manager Stacey Plaskett. He co-founded and directed the LL.M. program on law and government and co-founded the Marshall-Brennan Constitutional Literacy Project. From 1989 to 1990, Raskin served as general counsel for Jesse Jackson's National Rainbow Coalition. In 1996, he represented Ross Perot regarding Perot's exclusion from the 1996 United States presidential debates. Raskin wrote a Washington Post op-ed that strongly condemned the Federal Election Commission and the Commission on Presidential Debates for their decisions.

Maryland legislature
In 2006, Raskin was elected as a Maryland state senator for District 20, representing parts of Silver Spring and Takoma Park in Montgomery County. In 2012, he was named Senate majority whip and chaired the Montgomery County Senate Delegation and the Select Committee on Ethics Reform, and was a member of the Judicial Proceedings Committee.

Raskin sponsored bills advocating the repeal of the death penalty in Maryland, the expansion of the state ignition interlock device program, and the establishment of the legal guidelines for benefit corporations, a type of for-profit corporation that includes a material societal benefit in its bylaws and decision-making processes. A former board member of FairVote, he introduced and sponsored the first bill in the country for the National Popular Vote, a plan for an interstate compact to provide for presidential election by popular vote. Raskin long championed efforts to reform marijuana laws and legalize medical marijuana in Maryland. He introduced a medical marijuana bill in 2014 that was signed by Governor Martin O'Malley and went into effect in January 2015.

Raskin helped lead the fight to legalize same-sex marriage in Maryland. On March 1, 2006, during a Maryland State Senate hearing on same-sex marriage, Raskin was noted for his response to an opposing lawmaker: "Senator, when you took your oath of office, you placed your hand on the Bible and swore to uphold the Constitution. You did not place your hand on the Constitution and swear to uphold the Bible."

U.S. House of Representatives

Elections

2016

On April 19, 2015, The Baltimore Sun and The Washington Post reported that Raskin announced his campaign for Congress and said, "My ambition is not to be in the political center, it is to be in the moral center." The district's seven-term incumbent, Chris Van Hollen, gave up the seat to run for the United States Senate.

During the primary, Raskin was endorsed by the Progressive Action PAC, the political arm of the Congressional Progressive Caucus, which grew from 72 members at the time of the endorsement to 92 members in early 2020. Raskin won the seven-way Democratic primary—the real contest in this heavily Democratic district—with 33% of the vote. He was viewed as the most liberal candidate in the race. The primary election was the most expensive House race in 2016, and Raskin was heavily outspent.

During the general election, Raskin was endorsed by the Bernie Sanders-affiliated political organizing network Our Revolution, and the community organizing effort People's Action. He defeated Republican nominee Dan Cox with 60% of the vote.

Tenure 

As one of his first actions in Congress, Raskin and several other members of the House objected to the certification of the 2016 presidential election in favor of Donald Trump due to alleged ties with Russia, and Russia's interference in the 2016 election, as well as voter suppression efforts. Then-Vice President Joe Biden ruled their objection out of order because it had to be sponsored by at least one member of each chamber, and it had no Senate sponsor. Raskin questioned the legitimacy of the election, claiming it was "badly tainted by everything from cyber-sabotage by Vladimir Putin, to deliberate voter suppression by Republicans in numerous swing states". In late June 2017, Raskin was the chief sponsor of legislation to establish a congressional "oversight" commission with the authority to declare a president "incapacitated" and removed from office under the 25th Amendment to the United States Constitution.

In April 2018, Raskin, Jared Huffman, Jerry McNerney, and Dan Kildee launched the Congressional Freethought Caucus. Its stated goals include "pushing public policy formed on the basis of reason, science, and moral values", promoting the "separation of church and state", and opposing discrimination against "atheists, agnostics, humanists, seekers, religious, and nonreligious persons". Huffman and Raskin are co-chairs.

Raskin supports banning discrimination based on sexual orientation and gender identity. In 2019, he voted in favor of the Equality Act and urged Congress members to do the same.

On January 12, 2021, Raskin was named the lead impeachment manager for the Senate trial during Trump's second impeachment. He was the primary author of the impeachment article, along with Representatives David Cicilline and Ted Lieu, which charged Trump with inciting an insurrection on the United States Capitol. During the Senate trial, Raskin recounted that after being there on January 6 as the mob was forcibly entering, his daughter said to him, "Dad, I don't want to come back to the Capitol".

In February 2022, while his wife was under consideration for a position as the Federal Reserve's vice chair of supervision, it was reported that Raskin violated the Stop Trading on Congressional Knowledge Act by failing to properly disclose her share dealings. One instance was when his wife received stock for advising a Colorado-based financial technology trust company, and the other was when she sold stock in Reserve Trust for $1.5 million, but the sale was not disclosed for eight months. His wife had sat on the advisory board of the Federal Reserve when it "granted Reserve Trust unusual access to its master account", but it is not clear when she first acquired the shares.

Syria 
In 2023, Raskin voted against H.Con.Res. 21 which directed President Joe Biden to remove U.S. troops from Syria within 180 days.

Investigation into the January 6 attack on the Capitol 
On July 1, 2021, Raskin was one of seven Democrats appointed to the United States House Select Committee on the January 6 Attack by Speaker Nancy Pelosi. Following the announcement, Raskin said, "As Chair of the Oversight Committee's Civil Rights and Civil Liberties Subcommittee, I've helped lead the Oversight Committee's painstaking investigation into violent white supremacy over the last two years. The Department of Homeland Security (DHS) has declared domestic violent extremism the number one security threat in the country. We saw that threat explode right in front of our eyes at the Capitol on January 6."

On July 12, 2022, Raskin co-led the Select Committee's seventh public hearing with Representative Stephanie Murphy. The hearing focused on the role the far-right extremist groups Proud Boys and Oath Keepers played in organizing the attack. It also discussed the importance of Trump's December 19 tweet "Big protest in D.C. on January 6th. Be there, will be wild!" and how it spread to his supporters. To show the impact, the committee played recordings of its interview with an anonymous Twitter employee who worked from 2020 to 2021 and was on the team responsible for the platform's content moderation policies. During the interview, they said that the tweet served as a "call to action, and in some cases as a call to arms" to his supporters.

In Raskin's closing statement of the July 12 hearing, he opened by emphasizing the importance of the December 19 tweet: "When Donald Trump sent out his tweet, he became the first president ever to call for a crowd to descend on the capital city to block the constitutional transfer of power." He later summarized the second focus of the hearing: "On January 6, Trump knew the crowd was angry. He knew the crowd was armed. He sent them to the Capitol anyway." Raskin concluded his statement, "We need to defend both our democracy and our freedom with everything we have and declare that this American carnage ends here and now. In a world of resurgent authoritarianism and racism and antisemitism, let’s all hang tough for American democracy."

Committee assignments
Committee on House Administration
House Committee on the Judiciary 
Subcommittee on the Constitution, Civil Rights and Civil Liberties
Subcommittee on Antitrust, Commercial and Administrative Law 
House Committee on Oversight & Reform (Ranking Member, 2023-present)
Subcommittee on Civil Rights and Civil Liberties (Chair)
Subcommittee on Government Operations
Select Subcommittee on the Coronavirus Crisis
United States House Committee on Rules
 House Select Committee on the January 6 Attack
Outstanding Issues (Chair)

Party leadership and caucus membership
 House Democratic Caucus, Senior Whip 
 House Democratic Steering and Policy Committee, Freshman Representative
 Congressional Progressive Caucus, Vice Chair and Liaison to New Members
 Congressional LGBT Equality Caucus
 House Pro-Choice Caucus
 House Public Education Caucus
 House Quiet Skies Caucus
 House 115th Class Caucus
 House Baltic Caucus
 Congressional Freethought Caucus, Co-Founder and Co-Chair
 Congressional Asian Pacific American Caucus
 Congressional NextGen 9-1-1 Caucus
 Congressional Solar Caucus
Medicare for All Caucus

Electoral history

2016

2018

2020

2022

Personal life
Raskin is married to Sarah Bloom Raskin, who served as the Maryland Commissioner of Financial Regulation from 2007 to 2010. They live in Takoma Park, Maryland. President Barack Obama nominated her to the Federal Reserve Board on April 28, 2010. On October 4, 2010, she was sworn in as a governor of the Federal Reserve Board by Fed Chairman Ben Bernanke. President Joe Biden nominated her for chair of the Federal Reserve Board, but Republicans boycotted her committee hearing and Joe Manchin opposed her because of her views on the use of monetary policy to address climate change. Given that stalemate, she withdrew her nomination. She served as the United States Deputy Secretary of the Treasury from March 19, 2014, to January 20, 2017.

The Raskins have two daughters, Hannah and Tabitha, and had a son, Thomas. On December 31, 2020, Raskin's office announced that his son Thomas (Tommy), a graduate of Montgomery Blair High School, a graduate of Amherst College, and a second-year student at Harvard Law School, had died at the age of 25. On January 4, 2021, Raskin and his wife posted a tribute to their son online that stated that, after a prolonged battle with depression, he had died by suicide. In a farewell note, Thomas said, "Please forgive me. My illness won today. Look after each other, the animals and the global poor. All my love, Tommy." Thomas was buried on January 5, 2021. The next day, Raskin was in the Capitol with his daughter and son-in-law during the January 6 Capitol attack. Hours later, he began drafting an article of impeachment against President Trump, and six days later, House Speaker Nancy Pelosi named Raskin the lead manager of Trump's second impeachment. His 2022 book Unthinkable: Trauma, Truth, and the Trials of American Democracy focuses on his son's life and his preparation for the impeachment trial.

Raskin has been vegetarian since 2009.

Health
In May 2010, Raskin was diagnosed with colon cancer. He received six weeks of radiation and chemotherapy, and surgery to remove part of his colon, followed by more chemotherapy through early 2011. 

In December 2022, Raskin announced that he had been diagnosed with diffuse large B-cell lymphoma, and said he would undergo chemoimmunotherapy.

Publications
 The Wealth Primary: Campaign Fundraising and the Constitution (1994) (with John Bonifaz)
 Overruling Democracy: The Supreme Court versus the American People (2003)
 We the Students: Supreme Court Cases for and about Students (2014)
 Youth Justice in America (2014) (with Maryam Ahranjani and Andrew G. Ferguson)
Unthinkable — Trauma, Truth, and the Trials of American Democracy (2022)

Notes and references

Notes

References

External links

Congressman Jamie Raskin
Campaign website

Urban Legends Reference Pages: Politics (Jamie Raskin)
WCL Faculty Page

|-

1962 births
20th-century American Jews
20th-century American lawyers
20th-century American male writers
20th-century American non-fiction writers
21st-century American Jews
21st-century American lawyers
21st-century American male writers
21st-century American non-fiction writers
21st-century American politicians
American University faculty and staff
American atheists
American humanists
American Jews from Maryland
American legal scholars
American legal writers
American memoirists
American people of Russian-Jewish descent
American political writers
American scholars of constitutional law
Democratic Party members of the United States House of Representatives from Maryland
Georgetown Day School alumni
Harvard College alumni
Harvard Law School alumni
Jewish American non-fiction writers
Jewish American state legislators in Maryland
Jewish members of the United States House of Representatives
Lawyers from Washington, D.C.
Liberalism in the United States
Living people
Maryland lawyers
Democratic Party Maryland state senators
People from Takoma Park, Maryland
Politicians from Washington, D.C.
Writers from Washington, D.C.